Jan Repas (born 19 March 1997) is a Slovenian professional footballer who plays as a midfielder for Slovenian PrvaLiga club Maribor.

Club career

Domžale
Repas made his professional debut for Domžale on 28 November 2015 in the Slovenian PrvaLiga match against Koper.

Caen
In August 2017, Repas signed for Caen for a reported fee of about €1 million.

Maribor
On 30 June 2018, Repas signed for Slovenian side Maribor until 2023.

Career statistics

Notes

References

External links
 NZS profile 
 

1997 births
Living people
Footballers from Ljubljana
Slovenian footballers
Association football midfielders
Slovenian PrvaLiga players
Ligue 1 players
Championnat National 3 players
Ligue 2 players
NK Domžale players
Stade Malherbe Caen players
NK Maribor players
Slovenian expatriate footballers
Slovenian expatriate sportspeople in France
Expatriate footballers in France
Slovenia youth international footballers
Slovenia under-21 international footballers
Slovenia international footballers